The Great World Beer Fest (GWBF), originally known as “Brewtopia” was established in 2002 and was a long-running, large beer festival in New York City.  Billed as the "United Nations of Beer,” GWBF featured brewers from around the world in a fun, competitive, and prominent festival designed to increase the public's awareness of craft beers.  Traditionally held in the fall, the GWBF held its eighth and final event in 2010.

References

External links 
Brewtopia: The Great World Beer Fest
Festival of Beer: Search for Beer Festivals around the World

Beer festivals in the United States
Festivals in New York City
Beer in New York City